The Battle of Port Cros was a battle of World War II fought off the French Riviera in the Mediterranean Sea on the island of Port-Cros. The battle began when a United States Navy warship encountered two German warships in August 1944 while supporting the Allied Operation Dragoon. It was one of the few surface engagements fought between the US Navy and the German Kriegsmarine. Later that day, the combined American and Canadian Devil's Brigade was dropped on the main island and captured the German-held positions.

Battle
UJ6081 was armed with one  gun and two  torpedo tubes. The aviso was armed with two  guns. It was early morning off Port Cros, about four hours before the Allied landing in Vichy France, when the Americans sighted the German corvette. Commander Willam Christopher Hughes ordered a torpedo attack and directed his men to battle stations.

A spread of torpedoes was launched and the Germans opened fire as they attempted to maneuver out of harm's way. However, one torpedo slammed into the UJ6081s hull and she quickly began to sink. SG21 was then spotted coming to the rescue. She was engaged by Somers main gun battery. The ensuing duel lasted for a few minutes until SG21 was hit several times and began taking in water. Within a few more minutes, both German ships went down and Somers therefore left the area for naval gunfire support missions against targets along the French mainland. American forces suffered no damage or casualties.

Later that day, a mixed regiment of United States Army and Canadian Army infantry, the 1st Special Service Force, was dropped onto Port Cros and captured the five forts after a day-long battle with their German garrisons. The Allies assaulted two or three forts and seized the remaining without resistance. Nine paratroopers were killed in the land battle.

Aftermath
As a result of the battle, Commander Hughes was recognized for his victory and eventually rose to the rank of rear admiral partly due to his involvement in this action. After the engagement, the U.S. Army occupied Le Levant, another island nearby.

References
Notes

Bibliography

Port Cros
Naval battles of World War II involving Germany
Allied naval victories in the battle of the Mediterranean
Battles of World War II involving Canada
August 1944 events